Michael James Burton (born 5 November 1969) is an English former professional footballer who played in the Football League for Birmingham City and Shrewsbury Town. He played as a midfielder.

Burton was born in Tamworth, Staffordshire. He joined Birmingham City as a YTS trainee in 1986, and turned professional the following year. He made his first-team debut as a substitute in the League Cup in September 1988, and his first appearance in the Second Division on 25 March 1989, coming on as substitute for Gary Childs in a 2–0 defeat away to Leicester City. He made two more appearances from the bench in the 1988–89 season, but that was the end of his first-team career at Birmingham. He joined Sheffield Wednesday briefly in 1991, but without playing for their first team, and then spent a year with Shrewsbury Town before dropping into non-league football.

References

External links

1969 births
Living people
Sportspeople from Tamworth, Staffordshire
English footballers
Association football midfielders
Birmingham City F.C. players
Sheffield Wednesday F.C. players
Shrewsbury Town F.C. players
Moor Green F.C. players
Milton Keynes Borough F.C. players
Bromsgrove Rovers F.C. players
Solihull Borough F.C. players
Redditch United F.C. players
English Football League players